Roman Mogutnov (born 6 February 1997 in Almaty), mostly known by his stage name Mix-Roman, is a Russian trance, House, DJ, record producer and radio host. He hosts a radio show called 'Digital Sound'. He has releases on several record labels such as Alveda Music, Magik Muzik, Spinnin' Records, and B-Sonic. He has gained popularity over the years and received support from artists including Bobina, DJ Feel, Mike Foyle, Omnia and many others. Mix-Roman played at one stage with Armin van Buuren, Tenishia, Alexander Popov, MaRLo. Sometimes he is named the 'Russian David Gravell', as he is one of pioneers of the big room trance style.

Accomplishments
 2009 Mix-Roman’s single “The Top” was first in Russian Top 40 on Energy FM
 2010 Mix-Roman’s single “Photon” was first in Kazakhstan Top 10 Energy FM
 2014 Mix-Roman’s single “Let's Move” was first in Kazakhstan Top 10 Energy FM
 2015 Mix-Roman’s single “Playground (Part I)” was 8th in Russia Top 100 DFM

Discography

Albums
2011 Autumn XL Remixes
2012 Autumn XL Remixes Vol.2
2013 Sentimental Sound
2014 Let's Move
2016 Playground (Part I)

Singles/EPs

2008 'The Top' (with Dj Viduta)  (CD-R)
2010 'Back Again' (T-live)
2010 'Regeneration' (CD-R)
2011 'Trance Sensation' (CD-R)
2012 'Sentimental Sound' (M.R.S.)
2012 'Photon' (CD-R)
2013 'Breakaway' (with Chloe Davis) (T-Live)
2013 'Diamond Rain' (with Dj Vengeance) (B-Sonic)
2014 'Let's Move' (with Jason Drake) (M.R.S.)
2015 'Winter' (Global Music)
2015 'Welcome To Amsterdam' (Global Music)
2015 'Instant' (Global Music)
2015 'Without You' (with Anastasia Grinina) (M.R.S.)
2015 'Playground (Part I)' (M.R.S.)
2015 'Try' (Tesseract Music Group)
2016 'Rave' (Spinnin' Records)
2016 'Captain Sever' (Electric Touch)
2016 'Pallaroid' (Tesseract Music Group)
2017 'Tremor (Spinnin' Records)
2017 'Let's Move' (Tesseract Premium)
2017 '28' (Alveda Liquid)

Remixes
2009 Far East Movement - Like A G 6 [T-Live]
2010 Bobina Ft. [Винтаж] - "На На На" (Mix-Roman Remix) [Diamond]
2010 Kesha - "Tik Tok" (Mix-Roman Summer Edit) [CD-R]
2014 Armin van Buuren Ft. Christian Burns - "This Light Between Us" (Mix-roman Intro Mix) [Magik Music]
2014 Gaia - "Tuvan" (Mix-roman Remix) [Armind]
2014 Calvin Harris Ft. Example - "We'll Be Coming Back" (Mix-Roman Remix) [M.R.S.]
2015 Steve Aoki Ft. Luke Steele - "Neon Future" (Mix-Roman Edit) [CD-R]
2015 The Chainsmokers Ft. SirenXX - Kanye (Mix-Roman Remix) [M.R.S.]
2016 Mike Candys Ft. Clyde Taylor - "Make It Home" (Mix-Roman Remix) [Electric Touch], [S2 Records]
2016 The Chainsmokers Ft. [ROZES] - "Roses" (Mix-Roman Remix) [Electric Touch]
2016 Sam Feldt Ft. Wulf - "Summer on You" (Mix-Roman Remix) [Spinnin' Records]
2017 Solovey - "Madrid" (Mix-Roman Remix) [Tesseract Premium]
2017 Coldplay - "A Sky Full Of Stars" (Mix-Roman Remix) [FFRR]
2018 Fram! - "Limits" (Mix-Roman Remix) [Alveda Liquid]

DJ Mixes
2015 "Insane Spring"
2016 "Beautiful World"

References

External links
 
 
 
 

Living people
Russian trance musicians
Club DJs
Remixers
1997 births